The Union County Vocational-Technical Schools (UCVTS) are a grouping of schools on the Union County Vocational Technical Schools Campus in Scotch Plains, New Jersey, United States, which offers educational programs for students across Union County, eight at the high school level for students in ninth through twelfth grades and one at the adult education level. The high school level programs are separated into two groups, full-time students and shared-time students; and the full-time programs are further subdivided into the vocational program and career academies.

As of the 2020–21 school year, the district, comprised of eight schools, had an enrollment of 1,633 students and 138.7 classroom teachers (on an FTE basis), for a student–teacher ratio of 11.8:1.

Awards and recognition 
Union County Magnet High School was recognized by Governor Jim McGreevey in 2003 as one of 25 schools selected statewide for the First Annual Governor's School of Excellence award.

In 2016, the Academy for Performing Arts was one of ten schools in New Jersey, and one of two high school programs in the state, recognized as a National Blue Ribbon School by the United States Department of Education. The Academy for Allied Health Sciences was one of nine public schools—and the only public high school—recognized in 2017 as Blue Ribbon Schools by the U.S. Department of Education. 

In 2021, the Academy for Information Technology (AIT) was given the Blue Ribbon School award by the U.S. Department of Education.

2015 pink slipping of teachers 
On April 27, 2015, a group of 43 non-tenured teachers at the Union County Vocational Technical Schools were given non-renewal notices. Students staged protests to show support for the non-tenured teachers. On April 30, about 90 percent of district students wore red T-shirts in support of their teachers. On May 1, the students staged a sit-in before the start of classes. Students planned this sit-in to avoid breaking any school rules. The students planned to appear at the May 4 Board of Education meeting in support of their teachers.

High school level programs 
Full-time UCVTS programs 
Schools in the district (with 2020–21 enrollment data from the National Center for Education Statistics) are:
Full-time Career and technical academies
Union County Academy for Allied Health Sciences (AAHS) with 305 students in grades 9-12
Kevin Dougherty, Principal
Union County Academy for Information Technology (AIT) with 284 students in grades 9-12
Colleen D. Gialanella, Principal
Union County Academy for Performing Arts (APA) with 226 students in grades 9-12
Kelly Douglas-Jackson, Interim Principal
Union County Magnet High School (MHS) with 297 students in grades 9-12
Alice Mansfield-Smith, Principal
Union County Vocational-Technical High School (UCTECH) with 498 students in grades 9-12
Jeffrey Lerner, Principal

Shared-time / Alternative UCVTS programs
Raymond J. Lesniak Experience Strength & Hope Recovery High School with 6 students in grades 9-12
Simon Youth Academy with 20 students in grades 9-12
Union County Career & Technical Institute with 18 students in grades 9-12

Administration
Core members of the district's administration are:
Gwendolyn Ryan, Superintendent
Janet Behrmann, Business Administrator / Board Secretary

Athletics 
An intramural program is provided for after school physical activity. For official sports recognized by the NJSIAA, students participate on their home high schools' teams.

Campus newspaper
UC Juice, Union County Juice, is the monthly newspaper for the UCVTS campus. It is based in the Academy for Information Technology building. While it is called a newspaper, it more closely resembles a magazine in that it is made using duplex A4 paper stapled with three staples on the right binding. The staff use Adobe InDesign as its layout program.

The original name for UC Juice was TechToday. It was changed due to the addition of the Academy for Performing Arts school on campus, rendering the name TechToday unfitting for the campus newspaper.

History
TechToday was founded in 2006–2007 school year. During its first year it released 3 issues, typically around four pages long. Each edition consisted of a news section and an arts section (called TechToday Arts).

At the end of the 2006/2007 school year, management was failing and most of the work was being done by the advisor at the time. He appointed two new editors, Phyllis Lee and Taylor Kelly, to take over the next year.

At the 2007-2008 club fair, TechToday had approximately 150 people sign up to join the club. Throughout the year, it had six issues released. It went through a layout program change, from Microsoft Publisher to Apple Pages.  It also went under a layout design change, which was well received across campus.

At the 2008-2009 club fair, TechToday had 119 people sign up to join the club. It is planning on switching from Apple Pages to Adobe InDesign as its layout program.

On September 16, 2008, TechToday changed its name to UC Juice. Because the name 'TechToday' did not fit the addition of the Academy for Performing Arts to the UCVTS campus, the name was decided to be changed. The other possible choices were: 'UCVTS Utopian', 'The Ubiquitarian', 'UC Inquirer', 'UCVTS United', and 'UC Juice', and were voted on. UC Juice won by a landslide. The name UC Juice was originated from the nickname of one of the freshman members, Juice.

In 2010 the paper changed its name once again, becoming The Campus Inquirer. Which it is still named today.

References

External links
Union County Vocational Technical Schools Website

Data for the Union County Vocational Technical Schools, National Center for Education Statistics
2009 - 2010 Salaries for Certificated Staff

School districts in Union County, New Jersey
Scotch Plains, New Jersey
Vocational school districts in New Jersey